Charles Jacob "Jake" Hewitt (June 6, 1870 – May 15, 1959) was a pitcher in Major League Baseball. He was the first left-handed pitcher for the Pittsburgh Pirates in 1895. Hewitt played two seasons of college baseball (1894–1895) for the West Virginia Mountaineers.

References

External links

1870 births
1959 deaths
Major League Baseball pitchers
Pittsburgh Pirates players
Baseball players from West Virginia
19th-century baseball players
West Virginia Mountaineers baseball players
Rochester Browns players
Warren (minor league baseball) players
Grand Rapids Rippers players
Grand Rapids Gold Bugs players
New Castle Salamanders players
New Castle Quakers players